The Johns Multiplane was a very large unsuccessful experimental aircraft having seven wings and six ailerons,  powered by three Liberty L-12 V-12 aircraft engines. The machine had the appearance of a biplane spliced onto the front of a triplane with two wings added at the rear. The center fuselage housed the cockpit and one engine in tractor configuration. Both side booms ended with wing-mounted engines in pusher configuration.

Design and development
Designed by Herbert Johns of the American Multiplane Company in Bath, New York,
Patent # 1,365,995 Flying Machine was granted to Charles A. Herrmann, also of the American Multiplane Company on Oct. 3, 1916.

Operational history
The massive septi-wing made a series of short hops during testing, but was eventually scrapped in 1920 due to its inability to maintain controlled flight.

Specifications

References

External links
 Arizona Aviation History archived image

Johns Multiplane
Multiplane aircraft
Three-engined push-pull aircraft
Aircraft first flown in 1919